Louis Setshwane is a Botswanan former footballer who played as a midfielder. He won one cap for the Botswana national football team in 1999.

See also
Football in Botswana

References

External links
 

Association football midfielders
Botswana footballers
Botswana international footballers
Living people
Botswana Defence Force XI F.C. players
Year of birth missing (living people)